The Ehrhardt was a German automobile manufactured from 1905 until 1924.  The company was founded by Gustav Ehrhard, son of Heinrich Ehrhardt of Dixi.  Its operations were centered at Zella-St-Blasii and at Düsseldorf.  Ehrhardts came in two- and four-cylinder models of high quality and price.  The largest was a 7956cc four-cylinder which had four-wheel brakes by 1913.  After 1918, the factory produced a 40 hp four-cylinder and a 55 hp six-cylinder, both luxury cars with ohc engines.

Ehrhardt was succeeded in 1924 by Ehrhardt-Szawe.

References

Defunct motor vehicle manufacturers of Germany